Sorbus sargentiana, Sargent's rowan is a species of flowering plant in the family Rosaceae, native to southwestern Sichuan and northern Yunnan in China, where it grows at altitudes of .

Name
The specific epithet sargentiana refers to the American dendrologist Charles Sprague Sargent.

Description
The bark is dark grey, and the shoots very stout, with large (1–2 cm), dark red, sticky resinous winter buds. The pinnate leaves consist of 9–11 oblong-lanceolate leaflets  cm long and  broad, with an acute apex, serrated margins. The basal leaflets are slightly smaller than the apical leaflets. They change to a rich orange-pink to purple or dark red in mid-autumn (fall). The flowers are 5–7 mm in diameter, with five white petals and 20 yellowish-white stamens; they are produced 200–500 together in very large corymbs  in diameter, in late spring to early summer. The fruit is a pome 5–8 mm diameter, bright orange-red to red, maturing in early autumn; it is juicy, and readily eaten as soon as it is ripe by thrushes, which disperse the seeds.

Cultivation and uses
It is grown as an ornamental tree for its bold foliage, huge clusters of fruit, and bright autumn colour. It has gained the Royal Horticultural Society's Award of Garden Merit.

References

Further reading
Hadfield, M. "Sorbus sargentiana Koehre." Quart. J. Forest 72.2 (1978): 105–107.

sargentiana
Endemic flora of China
Trees of China
Plants described in 1913